Sihapar Halt railway station is a railway station on Lucknow–Gorakhpur line under the Lucknow NER railway division of North Eastern Railway zone. This is situated beside National Highway 28 at Kashroul, Sahjanwa in Gorakhpur district in the Indian state of Uttar Pradesh.

References

Railway stations in Gorakhpur district
Lucknow NER railway division